"All I Want" is the first single by A Day to Remember from their fourth studio album What Separates Me from You. It was released officially to radio stations in October 2010, and as a commercial single, albeit a limited edition 7" vinyl, in April 2011. In August 2016, the song was certified gold in the U.S. by the RIAA.

Composition
Unlike the band's more-known metalcore sound which incorporates growling vocals and breakdowns, the song uses almost none of these attributes, and instead shows a direction towards fast-paced pop punk with clean vocals. Lead vocalist Jeremy McKinnon wrote the lyrics, while the music was written by himself, guitarist Kevin Skaff and A Day to Remember. McKinnon stated that the song is about "taking chances, and doing what you think is right regardless of what people might think. To be honest, whats more important? Live life, and be happy with yourself". McKinnon said in a 2011 interview with USA Today that the song is also "about being in a band." The song, along with three others from the album, was mixed by David Bendeth. As the choice of a single, guitarist Neil Westfall said "All I Want" "was a great transition song from 'Homesick'".

Music video
The music video for the song, which was filmed in October 2010, was released on January 6, 2011. It features cameos of numerous popular bands and musicians. The cameos are:  Tom Denney (A Day to Remember's former guitarist), Pete Wentz, Winston McCall of Parkway Drive, The Devil Wears Prada, Bring Me the Horizon, Sam Carter of Architects, Dallas Taylor from Maylene and the Sons of Disaster, Silverstein, Andrew W.K., August Burns Red, Seventh Star, Matt Heafy of Trivium, Vic Fuentes of Pierce the Veil, Mike Herrera of MxPx, Vincent Bennet of The Acacia Strain, Veara, and Set Your Goals. Rock Sound called the video "quite excellent".

Release
The song was released as a radio single on October 12, 2010, although it premiered a week earlier on October 7 on KROQ-FM radio's website, which gave the site its most web traffic ever. "All I Want" charted on both Billboards Hot Modern Rock Tracks and Hot Rock Songs charts, at number 12 and number 25, respectively. A few days after the release of the music video for song, the band went on Jimmy Kimmel Live!, on January 11, 2011, and it became their national television debut on which they performed "All I Want" and "Better Off This Way". On April 16, the band released an exclusive 7" vinyl single of the song, especially for Record Store Day. The vinyl pressing was limited to 2,000 copies for the U.S. and 1,000 copies for the international release and featured an acoustic version of "All I Want" as the B-side. The acoustic version was recorded at The Wade Studios, and was mixed by Andrew Wade. "All I Want" is available to play on the Rock Band games as well as Rocksmith 2014. The song is also used as the theme song of Total Nonstop Action Pay Per View Victory Road 2011.

Track listing
Digital download
"All I Want" – 3:22

Promotional CD
"All I Want" (album version) – 3:23
"All I Want" (screamless) – 3:21

7" vinyl
"All I Want" – 3:22
"All I Want" (acoustic) – 3:14

Personnel
Personnel per "All I Want" 7" sleeve.

A Day to Remember
Josh Woodard – bass, backing vocals 
Neil Westfall – rhythm guitar, backing vocals
Jeremy McKinnon – vocals
Alex Shelnutt – drums
Kevin Skaff – lead guitar, second vocals in acoustic version

Production
Chad Gilbert – producer
Andrew Wade and Jeremy McKinnon – co-producers
David Bendeth – mixing
Mike C. Hardcore – illustrations
Jeremy Saffer – band photo
Doublej – layout
Jeremy McKinnon – art direction

Chart positions

Peak positions

Year-end charts

Certifications

References
 Footnotes

 Citations

External links

"All I Want (Acoustic)" at Myspace (streamed copy where licensed)
"All I Want" song review at Mind Equals Blown.

2010 singles
A Day to Remember songs
Song recordings produced by Andrew Wade
Song recordings produced by Chad Gilbert
Songs written by Jeremy McKinnon
Song recordings produced by Jeremy McKinnon
Victory Records singles
2010 songs